On August 5, 1976, as a result of the ABA–NBA merger, the NBA hosted a dispersal draft to select players from the Kentucky Colonels and Spirits of St. Louis, the two American Basketball Association (ABA) franchises that were not included in the ABA–NBA merger.

The eighteen NBA teams and the four ABA teams that joined the NBA, the Denver Nuggets, Indiana Pacers, New York Nets and San Antonio Spurs, were allowed to participate in the draft. The teams selected in reverse order of their win–loss percentage in the previous NBA and ABA seasons. The team that made a selection paid for the signing rights to the player, which were set by the league's committee. The money from the draft was used to help the four ABA teams that merged with the NBA to pay off some of their obligations to the two folded ABA franchises, the Colonels and Spirits. The team that made a selection was obligated to assume the player's ABA contract. The players who were not selected would become free agents.

Twenty players from the Colonels and the Spirits were available for the draft. Eleven were selected in the first round and the twelfth player was selected in the second round. Eight players were not selected and thus became a free agent. The Chicago Bulls used the first pick to select five-time ABA All-Star Artis Gilmore with a signing price of $1,100,000. The Portland Trail Blazers, who acquired the Atlanta Hawks' second pick, selected Maurice Lucas and Moses Malone with signing price of $300,000 and $350,000 respectively. Marvin Barnes, who was selected fourth by the Detroit Pistons was the second most expensive player in the draft with a signing price of $500,000. Several teams elected to pass their first-round picks and only the Kansas City Kings used the second-round pick. The draft continued until the third round, but no other players were selected.

References

Dispersal Draft
Kentucky Colonels
National Basketball Association draft
Spirits of St. Louis
ABA dispersal draft